This article contains information about the literary events and publications of 1980.

Events
March 6 – Marguerite Yourcenar becomes the first woman elected to the Académie française.
June 5
The Royal Shakespeare Company opens a production at the Aldwych Theatre, London, of The Life and Adventures of Nicholas Nickleby, adapted from Charles Dickens's novel by David Edgar.
Willy Russell's comedy Educating Rita opens in a Royal Shakespeare Company production with Julie Walters in the title rôle, at The Warehouse in London.
August 25 – Pramoedya Ananta Toer's This Earth of Mankind (Bumi Manusia), the first of a tetralogy of historical novels, the Buru Quartet, is published in Indonesia after Toer's release from ten years' political imprisonment. It is banned in the country the following year.
September – A production of Shakespeare's Macbeth with Peter O'Toole in the lead opens at the Old Vic Theatre, London. It is often seen one of the disasters in theatre history.
September 23 – The Field Day Theatre Company presents its first production, the première of Brian Friel's Translations, at the Guildhall, Derry, Northern Ireland.
November 27 – The English playwright Harold Pinter marries the biographer and novelist Lady Antonia Fraser after divorcing the actress Vivien Merchant.
December 8 – Mark David Chapman shoots John Lennon to death in New York City while carrying a copy of J. D. Salinger's 1951 novel The Catcher in the Rye, which he claims "is my statement."
unknown dates
Kane and Abel by Jeffrey Archer (published 1979), tops The New York Times Best Seller list.
Vasily Grossman's novel Life and Fate («Жизнь и судьба», completed 1959) is published for the first time, in Switzerland.
The first Tibetan-language literature journal, Tibetan Literature and Art, is published by the Tibet Autonomous Region Writers Association (TARWA); it features short stories.
The National Library of Indonesia is created by a merger.
The novella "An Old Song", published anonymously in 1877 in the magazine London, is identified as Robert Louis Stevenson's first published work of fiction.

New books

Fiction 

 Douglas Adams – The Restaurant at the End of the Universe
 Warren Adler – The War of the Roses
 Woody Allen – Side Effects
 V. C. Andrews – Petals on the Wind
 Jean M. Auel – The Clan of the Cave Bear
 Thomas Berger – Neighbors
 Anthony Burgess – Earthly Powers
 Ramsey Campbell, editor – New Tales of the Cthulhu Mythos
 Bruce Chatwin – The Viceroy of Ouidah
 Mary Higgins Clark – The Cradle Will Fall
 J. M. Coetzee – Waiting for the Barbarians
 Larry Collins and Dominique Lapierre -The Fifth Horseman
 Pat Conroy – The Lords of Discipline
 Basil Copper – Necropolis
 L. Sprague de Camp
 Conan and the Spider God
 The Purple Pterodactyls
 Mircea Diaconu – La noi, când vine iarna
 E. L. Doctorow – Loon Lake
 Marguerite Duras – L'Homme assis dans le couloir
 Allan W. Eckert – Song of the Wild
 Umberto Eco – The Name of the Rose (Il Nome della Rosa)
 Shusaku Endo (遠藤 周作) – The Samurai (侍)
 Ken Follett – The Key to Rebecca
 Frederick Forsyth – The Devil's Alternative
 Mary Jayne Gold – Crossroads Marseilles 1940
 William Golding – Rites of Passage
 Graham Greene – Dr. Fischer of Geneva
 Douglas Hill
 Day of the Starwind
 Deathwing Over Veynaa
 Robert E. Howard and L. Sprague de Camp – The Treasure of Tranicos
 Hammond Innes – Solomon's Seal
 P. D. James – Innocent Blood
 Stephen King – Firestarter
 Judith Krantz – Princess Daisy
 Björn Kurtén – Dance of the Tiger
 Manuel Mujica Láinez – El gran teatro
 Derek Lambert –  I, Said the Spy
 John le Carré – Smiley's People
 Madeleine L'Engle – A Ring of Endless Light
 Robert Ludlum – The Bourne Identity
 Ngaio Marsh – Photo Finish
 James A. Michener – The Covenant
 Haruki Murakami (村上 春樹) – Pinball, 1973 (1973 年のピンボール, Sen-Kyūhyaku-Nanajū-San-Nen no Pinbōru)
 Ryū Murakami (村上 龍) – Coin Locker Babies (コインロッカー・ベイビーズ)
 Cees Nooteboom – Rituals

 Robert B. Parker – Looking for Rachel Wallace
 Pepetela – Mayombe
 Ellis Peters – Monk's Hood
 Tom Phillips – A Humument: a treated Victorian novel (1st trade edition)
 Belva Plain – Random Winds
 Paulette Poujol-Oriol – Le Creuset (The Crucible)
 Marin Preda – Cel mai iubit dintre pământeni (The Most Beloved of Earthlings)
 Barbara Pym (died 1980) – Crampton Hodnet (written 1940)
 Herman Raucher – There Should Have Been Castles
 Mordecai Richler – Joshua Then and Now
 Marilynne Robinson – Housekeeping
 Salman Rushdie – Midnight's Children
 Sidney Sheldon – Rage of Angels
 Julian Symons – Sweet Adelaide
 Gay Talese – Thy Neighbor's Wife
 Walter Tevis – Mockingbird
 John Kennedy Toole (suicide 1969) – A Confederacy of Dunces
 Gene Wolfe – The Shadow of the Torturer
 Roger Zelazny
 Changeling
 The Last Defender of Camelot

Children and young people
Richard Adams
The Girl in a Swing
The Iron Wolf and Other Stories
Vivien Alcock – The Haunting of Cassie Palmer
Pamela Allen – Mr Archimedes' Bath
Lynne Reid Banks – The Indian in the Cupboard
Jill Barklem – Brambly Hedge series:
Spring Story
Summer Story
Autumn Story
Winter Story
Ruskin Bond – The Cherry Tree
Matt Christopher – Wild Pitch
Roald Dahl – The Twits
Thomas M. Disch – The Brave Little Toaster
Buchi Emecheta – Titch the Cat
Ruth Manning-Sanders – A Book of Spooks and Spectres
Thomas Meehan – Annie: An old-fashioned story
Robert Munsch – The Paper Bag Princess
Susan Musgrave
Gullband
Hag Head
Ruth Park – Playing Beatie Bow
Marjorie W. Sharmat – Gila Monsters Meet you at the Airport
Mary Stewart – A Walk in Wolf Wood
Eric Hill – Where's Spot?
Janet and Allan Ahlberg – Funnybones
Pam Adams – Mrs Honey's Hat

Drama
Howard Brenton – The Romans in Britain
Andrea Dunbar – The Arbor
David Edgar (adaptation) – The Life and Adventures of Nicholas Nickleby
Ronald Harwood – The Dresser
Ron Hutchinson – The Irish Play
Kenneth Ross – Breaker Morant
Willy Russell – Educating Rita
Sam Shepard – True West

Poetry

Valerio Magrelli – Ora serrata retinae
Oxford Book of Contemporary Verse

Non-fiction
Tony Benn – Arguments for Socialism
Pierre Berton – The Invasion of Canada
Maryanne Blacker and Pamela Clark – Australian Women's Weekly Children's Birthday Cake Book
David Bohm – Wholeness and the Implicate Order
L. Sprague de Camp – The Ragged Edge of Science
L. Sprague de Camp (as editor) – The Spell of Conan
Graham Chapman et al. – A Liar's Autobiography
Marilyn Ferguson – The Aquarian Conspiracy
Stanley Fish – Is There a Text in This Class? The Authority of Interpretive Communities
Julien Gracq – Reading Writing
Graham Greene – Ways of Escape
Jerry Hopkins and Danny Sugerman – No One Here Gets Out Alive
János Kornai – Economics of Shortage (Hiány)
Paul H. Lewis - Paraguay Under Stroessner
Samuel Liddell MacGregor Mathers – Grimoire of Armadel translation from French (posthumous)
Michael Medved and Harry Medved – The Golden Turkey Awards
Tom O'Carroll – Paedophilia: The Radical Case
Carl Sagan – Cosmos
Anastasio Somoza Debayle and Jack Cox - Nicaragua Betrayed
Ram Swarup – The Word as Revelation: Names of Gods
Alvin Toffler – The Third Wave
Bertram Myron Gross - Friendly Fascism: The New Face of Power in America

Births
January 1 - Satya Vyas, Indian (Hindi language) writer
May 1 - Jacek Dehnel, Polish poet, writer and translator
May 10 - Cristina Nemerovschi, Romanian writer
May 27 - Majlinda Nana Rama, Albanian pedagogue, writer and researcher
June 5 - Nestan Kvinikadze, Georgian writer, scriptwriter and journalist
September 11 - Dawit Kebede, Ethiopian journalist and publisher
October 29 - Louie Jon Agustin Sanchez, Philippine poet, fiction writer, critic and journalist
November 23 - Ishmael Beah, Siera Leonean author and human rights activist

Deaths
January 3
Joy Adamson, Silesian-born conservationist and writer living in Kenya (murdered, born 1910)
George Sutherland Fraser, Scottish poet and critic (born 1915)
January 11 – Barbara Pym, English novelist (cancer, born 1913)
February 25 – Caradog Prichard, Welsh poet and novelist in Welsh (born 1904)
March 12 – Eugeniu Ștefănescu-Est, Romanian poet, novelist and cartoonist (born 1881)
March 25 – James Wright, American poet (born 1927)
March 26 – Roland Barthes, French literary theorist (born 1915)
March 27 – Idris Jamma', Sudanese poet (died 1980) 
April 15 – Jean-Paul Sartre, French philosopher, novelist and dramatist (born 1905)
April 24 – Alejo Carpentier, French Cuban novelist and writer (cancer, born 1904)
May 7 – Margaret Cole, English political writer, biographer and activist (born 1893)
May 16 – Marin Preda, Romanian novelist (asphyxiation, born 1922)
June 7 
 Salvator Gotta, Italian writer (born 1887)
 Henry Miller, American novelist (born 1891)
June 20 – Amy Key Clarke, English mystical poet (born 1892)
June 27 – Carey McWilliams, American author, editor and lawyer (born 1905)
July 1 – C. P. Snow, English novelist and scientist (born 1905)
July 6 – Mart Raud, Estonian poet, playwright and writer (born 1903)
July 9 – Vinicius de Moraes, Brazilian poet and songwriter (born 1913)
July 17 – Traian Herseni, Romanian social scientist and journalist (born 1907)
July 26 – Kenneth Tynan, English-born theater critic (pulmonary emphysema, born 1927)
August 8 – David Mercer, English dramatist (born 1928)
August 10 – Gareth Evans, British philosopher (lung cancer, born 1946)
September 18 – Katherine Anne Porter, American novelist and essayist (born 1890)
November 9 – Patrick Campbell, Irish journalist and wit (born 1913)
December 2 – Romain Gary (Roman Kacew), French novelist (suicide, born 1914)
December 8 – John Lennon, English musician, songwriter and author (murdered, born 1940)
December 12 – Ben Travers, English playwright, screenwriter and novelist (born 1886)
December 14 – Nichita Smochină, Transnistrian Romanian ethnographer and journalist (born 1894)
December 21
 Marc Connelly, American playwright (born 1890)
 Nelson Rodrigues, Brazilian playwright, journalist and novelist (born 1912)
December 27 – Todhunter Ballard, American genre novelist (born 1903)
December 31 – Marshall McLuhan, Canadian philosopher (born 1911)

Awards
Nobel Prize for Literature: Czesław Miłosz

Australia
The Australian/Vogel Literary Award: Inaugural award to Archie Weller, The Day Of The Dog; the award is initially given to Paul Radley, who, in 1996, admits that his manuscript was actually written by his uncle.
Kenneth Slessor Prize for Poetry: David Campbell, Man in the Honeysuckle
Miles Franklin Award: Jessica Anderson, The Impersonators

Canada
See 1980 Governor General's Awards for a complete list of winners and finalists for those awards.

France
Prix Goncourt: Yves Navarre, Le Jardin d'acclimatation
Prix Médicis French: Jean-Luc Benoziglio, Cabinet-portrait who refused the prize, thus it was given to Jean Lahougue's Comptine des Height
Prix Médicis International: Andre Brink, Une saison blanche et sèche

United Kingdom
Booker Prize: William Golding, Rites of Passage
Carnegie Medal for children's literature: Peter Dickinson, City of Gold
Cholmondeley Award: George Barker, Terence Tiller, Roy Fuller
Eric Gregory Award: Robert Minhinnick, Michael Hulse, Blake Morrison, Medbh McGuckian
James Tait Black Memorial Prize for fiction: J. M. Coetzee, Waiting for the Barbarians
James Tait Black Memorial Prize for biography: Robert B. Martin, Tennyson: The Unquiet Heart
Whitbread Best Book Award: David Lodge, How Far Can You Go?

United States
American Academy of Arts and Letters Gold Medal for Drama: Edward Albee
Caldecott Medal: Barbara Cooney, Ox-Cart Man
Dos Passos Prize: Graham Greene
Nebula Award: Gregory Benford, Timescape
Newbery Medal for children's literature: Joan Blos, A Gathering of Days: A New England Girl's Journal
Pulitzer Prize for Drama: Lanford Wilson, Talley's Folly
Pulitzer Prize for Fiction: Norman Mailer, The Executioner's Song
Pulitzer Prize for Poetry: Donald Justice, Selected Poems

Elsewhere
Hugo Award for Best Novel: Arthur C. Clarke, The Fountains of Paradise
Premio Cervantes : Juan Carlos Onetti
Premio Nadal: Juan Ramón Zaragoza, Concerto grosso

Notes

References

 
Years of the 20th century in literature